Kattur  is a village in the Lalgudi taluk of Thanjavur district, Tamil Nadu, India.

Demographics 

As per the 2001 census, Koohur (Thirunallakoorur) had a total population of 1471 with 743 males and 728 females. The sex ratio was 980. The literacy rate was 87.57

References 

 

Villages in Thanjavur district